Automated erotic stimulation device may refer to:
Sex-machine
Vibrator (sex toy)

cs:Fucking machine
fr:Fucking machine
ja:ファッキングマシーン